Kilimanjaro Expedition is a sketch from the episode of Monty Python's Flying Circus "The Ant, an Introduction", also appearing in the Monty Python film And Now For Something Completely Different. It has been compared to a comic episode in Franz Kafka's The Castle in which the protagonist, K., is confused by twins assigned to assist him.

Overview
Arthur Wilson (Eric Idle), a young mountaineer, visits the office of Sir George Head, OBE (John Cleese), who is leading an expedition to Mount Kilimanjaro, on where he says he wants to build a bridge between the "two peaks". Head suffers severely from diplopia, and repeatedly believes there are two of everything, including Wilson and Mount Kilimanjaro, throughout the sketch. A guide, Jimmy Blankinsop (Graham Chapman) enters partway through and acts out the expedition route very physically, knocking over furniture in the process. Wilson leaves, feeling he has "absolutely no confidence in anyone involved in it", but the "other" Wilson (now visible) says "I'm game".

References

External links
Full text of the sketch at Orange Cow

Monty Python sketches